Amaurobius minor is a species of spider in the family Amaurobiidae, found in Eastern Europe.

References

minor
Spiders of Europe
Spiders described in 1915